The 12th Rhythmic Gymnastics Asian Championships was held in Tashkent, Uzbekistan from June 8 to 10, 2021.

Medalists

Medal table

References

Rhythmic Gymnastics Asian Championships
Gymnastics competitions in Uzbekistan
International gymnastics competitions hosted by Uzbekistan
2021 in gymnastics
Sport in Tashkent
2021 in Uzbekistani sport
June 2021 sports events in Asia